"Simple Song" is a song by American indie rock band The Shins from their fourth studio album Port of Morrow. Written by the group's frontman James Mercer, the song was released as the first single from the album.

Background
In an interview with Q, the band's frontman, James Mercer, has stated that the song was "about my wife, our relationship and this whole new life we [had] ahead of us." Additionally, Mercer stated that the song was also, in part, about the departures of drummer Jesse Sandoval and keyboardist Martin Crandall from The Shins.

Explaining the origins of the song, Mercer revealed that he wrote the song in the living room of his apartment, shortly following his marriage and in the period leading to the birth of his first daughter.

Musicians
Dave Hernandez – lead electric guitar
Greg Kurstin – acoustic guitar, electric guitar, synthesizers, Mellotron, piano
Ron Lewis – bass guitar
James Mercer – vocals, electric guitar
Janet Weiss – drums, tambourine

Music video
The surrealist music video, staged as Mercer's funeral, was directed by DANIELS, a directing duo best known as the team behind the video for the song "Turn Down for What", and the films Swiss Army Man and Everything Everywhere All at Once. His backing band at the time, Richard Swift, Joe Plummer, Yuuki Matthews and Jessica Dobson, appeared in double roles as Mercer's children and as the performers of the song, although none of them were featured on the actual recording.

Charts

Weekly charts

Year-end charts

In popular culture 

 In 2012, the song was used in an episode of Saturday Night Live (Season 37, Episode 17)
 In 2012, The Shins performed Simple Song on Late Show with David Letterman
 In 2013, Simple Song was featured in How I Met Your Mother (Season 8, Episode 24 "Something New")

References

2012 singles
The Shins songs
2012 songs
Columbia Records singles
Songs written by James Mercer (musician)
Song recordings produced by Greg Kurstin
Rock ballads